The Seattle Construction and Drydock Company was a shipbuilding company based in Seattle, Washington. Between 1911 and 1918, it produced a substantial number of ships for both commercial and military uses. In the beginning of the 20th century, until its significance was diluted by the emergence of a number of shipyards during the World War I shipbuilding boom, it was the largest of its kind in Seattle and one of the few significant ship yards along the West Coast of the United States, second only to the Union Iron Works in San Francisco.

History

Formally established in 1911, the shipyard could trace its history back to 1882, when the Moran brothers operated a machine shop at Yesler's Wharf in the lower story of a new sawmill employing 8 to 10 men, built by John Anderson and owned by Anderson and Henry Yesler, who is often regarded as the founder of the city of Seattle. At the end of the year 1882 they were constructing their own 24 by 40 feet two-story machine shop next to the Yesler mill. In 1884 Moran Brothers built the machinery for William Moore's steamship Teaser.

The Seattle Dry Dock & Shipbuilding Company was established in 1888, with Bailey Gatzert as president, Robert Moran as vice president and $75,000 in capital. It was located at the foot of Charles Street. Machinery was bought in New York during a visit by Robert Moran in the spring and arrived late in 1888. Work on the dry dock was expected to be complete by April 1889. Robert Moran was elected mayor of Seattle on 9 July 1888 and while his shop became a victim of the Great Seattle Fire of 6 June 1889, the business continued to expand and became the Moran Brothers Shipyard, located a few steps further south.

The Moran Brothers Co. was incorporated 19 December 1889 with a capital stock of $250,000 and no stock held outside the company. A newly built foundry on Charles street was employing 70 men in February 1890 (detailed description of the new plant). In 1902 there was a bonded debt of $500,000 first mortgage, 5% interest maturing from 1906 to 1912 and a stock of $1,000,000.

On February 27, 1906 the Moran family left the business, the yard was sold for $2,000,000 to Bertron, Storrs and Griscom of New York, who also gained the right to the company name and the yard now operated as The Moran Company and was bought by (unknown) on 30 December 1911 and became the Seattle Construction and Drydock Company. J. V. Patterson was president of both companies during the 1906 to 1916 period.

In July 1916, William H. Todd made one of the first acquisitions for the corporation that would become a national enterprise later on by buying Seattle Construction and Drydock. Todd's business at that time consisted of facilities in New York harbor along the waterfront of Red Hook, Brooklyn and in Weehawken Cove, Hoboken. Planned modernizations in 1916 included the addition of 2 slipways to the existing 3 and a new 15,000 ton dry dock to augment the 3 in operation (the dry dock apparently was not actually built). At the same time, Skinner & Eddy became a major shipbuilder in Seattle, their facilities built from the ground up starting in February of 1916 directly adjacent to the Seattle Construction yard. In 1918 Todd moved to the north end of Harbor Island to open a repair dock and Skinner & Eddy took control of both yards on the waterfront. The transfer took place on 11 May 1918, the price was $4,000,000. Skinner & Eddy were to pay the Emergency Fleet Corporation for the yard at a rate of $125,000 per completed ship. The Seattle Construction and Dry Dock Company was henceforth called Skinner & Eddy Plant No. 2.

Skinner & Eddy invested approx. $1,000,000 to modernize the plant, but defaulted on their payments after having paid $514,441.40 and the EFC repossessed the yard on 22 March 1920. On 21 January 1924 shipways and removable equipment were sold to the Schnitzer and Wolf Machinery Co, of Portland, Oregon for $226,255 and remaining "Balance of property owned" for $600,000 to the Port of Seattle on 31 December 1923. Three buildings remained "to be disposed of". In the 1930s, the area between Dearborn and Connecticut Street was Seattle's largest Hooverville.

Todd's facilities on Harbor Island would then be expanded in the winter of 1940 / 1941 and become the "Seattle" in Seattle-Tacoma Shipbuilding Corporation.

Of the 6 steel shipyards active during that time in Puget Sound, Seattle Construction was the only one that had existed prior to the outbreak of World War I. J. F. Duthie & Company had built small boats before, but underwent a major expansion of its facilities in 1916.

All three of the ships were laid down after long delays by the Todd yard in Tacoma. 

Clarence Bagley, in his History of Seattle from the earliest settlement to the present time, Volume 2, wrote:

. . .

The company produced over 90 ships, including a substantial number of battleships and submarines for the United States Navy, submarines for the Royal Canadian Navy, as well as commercial oceangoing vessels. The company formally ceased operations in 1918, due in large part to the poaching of its skilled laborers by newly established competitors. It ultimately was acquired by William H. Todd, who operated the company as a subsidiary of  the Todd Pacific Shipyards Corporation, which had been founded in 1916 as the William H. Todd Corporation. It became the "Seattle" in Seattle-Tacoma Shipbuilding Corporation and operated under that name during World War II as one of the biggest suppliers of escort carriers and destroyers for the United States Navy. Other companies operated by Todd included the Robins Dry Dock & Repair Company of Erie Basin, Brooklyn, New York, the Tietjen & Long Dry Dock Company of Hoboken, New Jersey.

Notes

References

1911 establishments in Washington (state)
Defunct shipbuilding companies of the United States
Companies based in Seattle
Shipbuilding in Washington (state)